Jayantha Seneviratne (born 6 June 1952) is a former cricketer who played first-class cricket for Sri Lanka cricket team from 1973 to 1979, playing in five unofficial Test matches against India, Pakistan and the West Indies.

Cricket career
He was educated at Nalanda College, Colombo, where he played cricket for the first XI from 1968 to 1970. After leaving school, he played for Bloomfield Cricket and Athletic Club in Colombo. He represented the Sri Lanka Board President's XI in 1973, and the Sri Lanka national team in 1974 and 1975.

He made his highest first-class score of 98 not out, the highest score of the match, when Sri Lanka lost by 17 runs to Pakistan in Karachi in 1973-74.

Jayantha is a former national selector and national coaching committee member of Sri Lanka Cricket, the governing body for cricket in Sri Lanka. He also coached Bhutan, and has served as a curator. He also runs a private coaching school and has coached at Nalanda College for many years.

Personal life
He and his wife Mekala live in Kohuwala, Colombo. They have three daughters.

References

External links

 
 
 
 
 
 

1952 births
Living people
Sri Lankan cricketers
Sri Lankan cricket coaches
Bloomfield Cricket and Athletic Club cricketers
Alumni of Nalanda College, Colombo